A-423,579 is one of a range of histamine antagonists developed by Abbott Laboratories which are selective for the H3 subtype, and have stimulant and anorectic effects in animal studies making them potentially useful treatments for obesity. A-423,579 has improved characteristics over earlier drugs in the series with both high efficacy and low toxicity in studies on mice, and is currently in clinical development.

References 

Fluoroarenes
H3 receptor antagonists
Benzonitriles
4-Hydroxybiphenyl ethers
Pyrrolidines